Netoxena is an extinct genus of moths within the family Eolepidopterigidae, containing one species, Netoxena nana, which is known from the Crato Formation of the Araripe Basin in northeastern Brazil. Its generic name was originally Xena Martins-Neto (1999); however, this name turned out to be preoccupied by a genus of chloropid flies Xena Nartshuk (1964). A replacement generic name Netoxena was coined in 2012.

References 

Eolepidopterigoidea
Fossil Lepidoptera
Cretaceous insects
Aptian life
Early Cretaceous animals of South America
Cretaceous Brazil
Fossils of Brazil
Crato Formation
Fossil taxa described in 1999